The 2019 World of Westgate 200 is a NASCAR Gander Outdoors Truck Series race held on September 13, 2019, at Las Vegas Motor Speedway in Las Vegas, Nevada. Contested over 134 laps on the  asphalt intermediate speedway, it was the 19th race of the 2019 NASCAR Gander Outdoors Truck Series season, third race of the Playoffs, and final race of the Round of 8.

Background

Track

Las Vegas Motor Speedway, located in Clark County, Nevada outside the Las Vegas city limits and about 15 miles northeast of the Las Vegas Strip, is a  complex of multiple tracks for motorsports racing. The complex is owned by Speedway Motorsports, Inc., which is headquartered in Charlotte, North Carolina.

Entry list

Practice

Qualifying

Qualifying results

Justin Johnson failed to qualify his No. 08 Kart Idaho Racing Toyota but still drove his truck renumbered with the No. 34 in the race since Jesse Iwuji crashed his No. 34 Chevrolet truck of Reaume Brothers Racing during qualifying but still made the race by Owners' points. Since Reaume Brothers Racing didn't have a backup truck, Iwuji withdrew from the race and let Johnson drive his (previously No. 08) truck in the race.
. – Playoffs driver

Race

Summary
Christian Eckes started on pole. Grant Enfinger's truck began smoking due to an oil leak near the beginning of the race, ultimately ending his race and championship hopes. Stewart Friesen also had a problem as it appeared he lost a cylinder during Stage 1. Repairs to the truck put him two laps down. Ross Chastain took the lead from Eckes early on and won Stage 1.

In Stage 2, a bizarre occurrence saw Johnny Sauter and Matt Crafton's trucks begin emitting fire simultaneously while they were on the same straightaway, sending them both to the garage. Crafton retired from the race, but Sauter later returned to the track. His truck started smoking shortly afterwards, ending his day for good. Afterwards, Ben Rhodes was the only ThorSport Racing driver whose truck's engine hadn't failed. Chastain continued his lead and won Stage 2.

In the closing laps, Austin Hill stayed out while rest of the field pitted, but he pitted during the final caution for tires. Hill made up lost track position, hunting down Chastain and taking the lead with 12 laps remaining. He remained ahead of Chastain and won the race. With Enfinger's playoff hopes already gone, Tyler Ankrum (who entered the race below the cutoff line) barely topped Sauter for the sixth and final spot due to his 11th-place finish, eliminating Sauter from the playoffs.

Stage Results

Stage One
Laps: 30

Stage Two
Laps: 30

Final Stage Results

Stage Three
Laps: 74

. – Driver advanced to the next round of the playoffs.

. – Driver was eliminated from the playoffs.

References

2019 in sports in Nevada
World of Westgate 200
NASCAR races at Las Vegas Motor Speedway